Baker is an unincorporated community in Okaloosa County, Florida, United States. A stop on the Florida, Alabama and Gulf Railroad, Baker was platted in 1910 and grew up around the timber and turpentine industries.

The Baker Block Museum is in Baker. Baker is home to Baker School, a public school in the Okaloosa County School District.

References

External links
 Northwest Florida Daily News

Unincorporated communities in Okaloosa County, Florida
Unincorporated communities in Florida